Khomajin (also Romanized as Khomājīn; also known as Khūmājin and Khvomeyn) is a village in Shur Dasht Rural District, Shara District, Hamadan County, Hamadan Province, Iran. At the 2006 census, its population was 340, in 70 families.

References 

Populated places in Hamadan County